Negotino is a village in the municipality of Vrapčište, North Macedonia. It used to be part of Negotino-Pološko Municipality.

History
According to the 1467-68 Ottoman defter, Negotino appears as being largely inhabited by an Orthodox Christian Albanian population. Some families had a mixed Slav-Albanian anthroponomy - usually a Slavic first name and an Albanian last name or last names with Albanian patronyms and Slavic suffixes.

The names are: Petro Arbanas; Gjorgji, his son; Gjon-i siromah (poor); Vasil, his brother; Gjorgji, son of Drall; Gjurk-o, son of Konda, Pejo Arbanas, Dimitri, son of Gjergj; Gjergj, son of Rad-in; Bogdan, son of Dralla; Borça, son of Kruzi (Kryezi); Gjergji, son of Petro; Mill (Miell), son of Petro; Radoslav, son of Domi-q; Miho, son of Radoslav; Dabzhiv, son of Domi-q.

Demographics
As of the 2021 census, Negotino had 3,068 residents with the following ethnic composition:
Albanians 2,962
Persons for whom data are taken from administrative sources 102
Macedonians 3
Others 1

According to the 2002 census, the village had a total of 3,673 inhabitants. Ethnic groups in the village include:
Albanians 3,659
Turks 1
Serbs 1 
Bosniaks 1
Others 11

References

External links

Villages in Vrapčište Municipality
Albanian communities in North Macedonia